Haluoleo University ( or ) is a public university in Kendari, Southeast Sulawesi, Indonesia. It was established on August 19, 1981. Its current rector is Muhammad Zamrun F.

Faculties
The university has 17 faculties, a vocational program, and postgraduate program. The faculties are:
 Faculty of Teacher Training and Education 
 Faculty of Economics and Business
 Faculty of Social and Political Sciences
 Faculty of Agriculture
 Faculty of Mathematics and Natural Science
 Faculty of Engineering
 Faculty of Law
 Faculty of Fishery and Marine Science
 Faculty of Public Health
 Faculty of Medicine
 Faculty of Animal Husbandry
 Faculty of Forestry and Environmental Science
 Faculty of Humanities Studies
 Faculty of Pharmacy
 Faculty of Agricultural Technology and Science
 Faculty of Geoscience and Technology
 Faculty of Administration Science

References

External links

 Official site

Universities in Southeast Sulawesi
Educational institutions established in 1981
Indonesian state universities
1981 establishments in Indonesia